The 2022–23 VfL Osnabrück season is the club's 124th season in existence and the club's second consecutive season in the second flight of German football. In addition to the domestic league, VfL Osnabrück are participating in this season's edition of the DFB-Pokal. The season covers the period from 1 July 2022 to 30 June 2023.

Players

First-team squad

Out on loan

Pre-season and friendlies

Competitions

Overview

3. Liga

League table

Results summary

Results by round

Matches
The league fixtures were announced on 24 June 2022.

Lower Rhine Cup

References

External links

VfL Osnabrück seasons
VfL Osnabrück